Barnes Icefalls are the icefalls along Washington Escarpment between Mount Dover and Bennett Spires in the Neptune Range, Pensacola Mountains. They were mapped by the United States Geological Survey from surveys and from U.S. Navy air photos, 1956–66, and named by the Advisory Committee on Antarctic Names for James C. Barnes, meteorologist and station scientific leader at Ellsworth Station, winter 1962.

References
 

Icefalls of Antarctica
Bodies of ice of Queen Elizabeth Land